Robert Herbert (21 November 1925 – 31 December 2006) was a Scottish footballer who played as a wing half in the English and Scottish Football Leagues.

Born in Glasgow, Scotland, Herbert started off with Blantyre Victoria before moving to Doncaster Rovers. It took a while to make his way into the first team, but by the time he left he had made 117 appearances over six seasons for the Division 2 club, and he'd netted 15 goals.

He then had a short spell at Midland League King's Lynn before returning to his native Scotland and briefly playing for Third Lanark in the Scottish First Division. Apparently Doncaster were paid £500 for Herbert without the approval of the Third Lanark board, so the manager was forced to pay this back out of his own pocket, although stole it back before being dismissed from his post.

Following an unsuccessful time at Third Lanark, he dropped down a league to Albion Rovers where he spent four seasons. Lastly he played league football for a season at Brechin City who finished bottom of the league that season.

References

1925 births
Footballers from Glasgow
Scottish footballers
Association football wing halves
Blantyre Victoria F.C. players
Doncaster Rovers F.C. players
King's Lynn F.C. players
Third Lanark A.C. players
Albion Rovers F.C. players
Brechin City F.C. players
English Football League players
Scottish Football League players
2006 deaths